In mathematics, contour sets generalize and formalize the everyday notions of
everything superior to something
everything superior or equivalent to something
everything inferior to something
everything inferior or equivalent to something.

Formal definitions 
Given a relation on pairs of elements of set 

and an element  of 

The formal expressions of the last two may be simplified if we have defined

Contour sets of a function 
In the case of a function  considered in terms of relation , reference to the contour sets of the function is implicitly to the contour sets of the implied relation

Examples

Arithmetic 
Consider a real number , and the relation .  Then

Consider, more generally, the relation

Then
 the upper contour set of  would be the set of all  such that ,
 the strict upper contour set of  would be the set of all  such that ,
 the lower contour set of  would be the set of all  such that , and
 the strict lower contour set of  would be the set of all  such that .

It would be technically possible to define contour sets in terms of the relation

though such definitions would tend to confound ready understanding.

In the case of a real-valued function  (whose arguments might or might not be themselves real numbers), reference to the contour sets of the function is implicitly to the contour sets of the relation

Note that the arguments to  might be vectors, and that the notation used might instead be

Economics 
In economics, the set  could be interpreted as a set of goods and services or of possible outcomes, the relation  as strict preference, and the relationship  as weak preference.  Then

Such preferences might be captured by a utility function , in which case
 the upper contour set of  would be the set of all  such that ,
 the strict upper contour set of  would be the set of all  such that ,
 the lower contour set of  would be the set of all  such that , and
 the strict lower contour set of  would be the set of all  such that .

Complementarity 

and the complement of the strict upper contour set is the lower contour set.

See also 
Epigraph
Hypograph

References

Bibliography 
 Andreu Mas-Colell,  Michael D. Whinston, and Jerry R. Green, Microeconomic Theory, p43.  (cloth)  (paper)

Mathematical relations